Lisa Raymond and Rennae Stubbs were the defending champions and both players played in the final, but with different partners.

Stubbs (partnering Elena Bovina) won the title by defeating Raymond (partnering Lindsay Davenport) 6–3, 6–4 in the final. It was the 7th title for Bovina and the 40th title for Stubbs in their respective doubles careers.

Seeds

Draw

Draw

References
 Main and Qualifying Draws

Toray Pan Pacific Open
Pan Pacific Open
2003 Toray Pan Pacific Open